Tomás Albornoz (born 17 September 1997) is an Argentine rugby union player who plays for the Benetton in Pro14. His playing position is Fly-half. 

On 21 November 2019, he was named in the Jaguares squad for the 2020 Super Rugby season.
In 2020 Albornoz he also played for Ceibos and in 2021 joined for Jaguares XV. 

After playing for Argentina Under 20 in 2017, from 2019 he was named in the Argentina XV. 
In August 2022 Albornoz was named in Argentina squad for 2022 Rugby Championship. He made his debut in Round 1 of the 2022 Rugby Championship against Australia.

References

External links

Jaguares (Super Rugby) players
Rugby union fly-halves
Argentine rugby union players
1997 births
Living people
Dogos XV players
Benetton Rugby players
Argentina international rugby union players